Wilbur Schwartz (17 March 1918 Newark, New Jersey – 3 August 1990 Los Angeles), aka Wil Schwartz or Willie Schwartz, was an American studio session clarinetist, alto saxophonist, and flutist who was widely known as a member of the Glenn Miller Orchestra.

Early years

Born in 1918 to Charles and Pearl Schwartz of Newark, New Jersey, young Willie studied music as a child, along with his older brother Jack. At the 14th Avenue School, he performed in various ensembles, some under the direction of Henry Melnick. Despite the trepidation of their parents, young West Side High schoolers Jack and Wil took a paying gig on a cruise ship, the Atlantida, down to Havana one summer. Jack graduated in January of 1935, with Wil following suit in January 1936. Club dates and an engagement with Julie Wintz's band kept young Wil employed, until a fateful night in lower Manhattan in 1938 changed everything-Wil was playing with a trio, and veteran trombonist Glenn Miller came into the club and liked what he heard.

Miller hits it big
With twenty year-old Wil playing lead clarinet over four saxes, Miller assiduously rehearsed and polished his band's sound: a smooth, "sweet" style of swing with distinctive arrangements by Miller and Bill Finnegan, among others. According to big band chronicler George T. Simon, "Willie's tone and way of playing provided a fullness and richness so distinctive that none of the later Miller imitators could ever accurately reproduce the Miller sound." Then, on March 1, 1939 (Miller's birthday), the band received word of being booked for the summer season at the Glen Island Casino, an auspicious showcase. Dates at the Meadowbrook Ballroom followed, with recording sessions for Bluebird and coast-to-coast radio broadcasts sponsored by Chesterfield. The Miller band was accorded the first gold record ever by the RIAA for "Chattanooga Choo-Choo" and hits that defined the era followed: "In The Mood", "Pennsylvania 6-5000", "A String Of Pearls", "I've Got A Gal In Kalamazoo", "American Patrol", "Tuxedo Junction", "Elmer's Tune", "Little Brown Jug", and the band's theme and the swing era's archetypical ballad, "Moonlight Serenade" on which Wil's golden clarinet tone was imprinted on a generation.

World War shake-up
Upon the United States' entry into the Second World War, Miller's patriotism spurred him to disband his civilian band at the peak of its' success and enlist in the Army Air Force. Despite repeated entreaties from Miller, Wil initially struck out on his own as a sideman, but sensing the inevitable, eventually enlisted in the Merchant Marines. Stationed on Catalina Island, he met lifelong friend Ted Nash, another woodwind legend who had come up from the Les Brown band. Following the war, Hollywood studio work blossomed and Wil was playing a five day-a-week radio show for Bob Crosby when he met Peggy Clark, she of the Sentimentalists with Tommy Dorsey. Six weeks later, they wed on September 17, 1948.

Postwar career
The studio work continued. Wil was in demand as a perfect sightreader and doubler on sax, clarinet, and flute (having studied with Roger Stevens). Sessions with his friend from the Miller days Billy May led to work with young Nelson Riddle, Gordon Jenkins, and others. Album work with Frank Sinatra, Ella Fitzgerald, Nat Cole, Judy Garland, and many others was supplemented by film work for up-and-comers like Henry Mancini and Neal Hefti. Playing for the Kennedy inauguration was a highlight, as was playing for Johnny Mandel on the film score of "The Sandpiper". Johnny Mann hired him in the band for The Joey Bishop Show (up against The Tonight Show With Johnny Carson, for which he occasionally played under Doc Severinson, or The Merv Griffin Show with leader Mort Lindsey). Wil's sound was in demand well into the 1980's, when composer John Williams tapped him to play for the score of "Indiana Jones And The Temple Of Doom", and James Horner for "Cocoon" and "Batteries Not Included".

Family life
Wil married Peggy Clark, whose career rivaled his. She was singing on The Jack Smith Show for radio when they met, and she became a prodigious session singer, recording for Mancini, Jud Conlon, Jimmy Joyce, Earl Brown, and many others.
Schwartz was the father of Karen, session singer for film, records, commercials, and television, and of Grammy-winning composer-arranger Nan Schwartz. Youngest son Doug is a music engineer.

References 

1918 births
1990 deaths
musicians from Newark, New Jersey
American clarinetists
20th-century American musicians
20th-century American male musicians
Glenn Miller Orchestra members
Earle Spencer Orchestra members